Black Shark 3 are line of Android-based gaming smartphones developed and manufactured by Xiaomi as part of its Black Shark product line. It is the successor to the Black Shark 2 line and was launched on March 03, 2020.

References 

Android (operating system) devices
Mobile phones introduced in 2020
Xiaomi smartphones
Mobile phones with multiple rear cameras
Mobile phones with 4K video recording